Big Font. Large Spacing is a 2010 British comedy film directed by Paul Howard Allen. Set in Cardiff, the film tells the story of a night in the life of two psychology students who find out that the term's major essay is due in the next morning. The film was toured around British universities on a touring cinema over three years during the freshers week period.

Cast
 Jamie Kristian as Tom
 Amy Morgan as Sarah
 Gareth Aldon as Steve
 Kimberley Wintle as Debbie

Production
The film was produced by 33Story Productions and Boomerang, both Cardiff-based television/film production companies. Principal photography took place over three weeks in December 2008.

Release
The film premiered at the Atlanta Film Festival on 17 April 2010. It was then taken around universities during the September/October freshers week period by the film makers themselves over a three-year period. On 24 September 2010, the film was released on DVD in the United Kingdom.

References

External links
 
 Little White Lies Article: Grass Roots - Big Font. Large Spacing

2010 films
2010s coming-of-age comedy films
2010 independent films
2010s teen comedy films
British coming-of-age comedy films
British independent films
British teen comedy films
Films set in Cardiff
Films set in universities and colleges
Films shot in Wales
2010 directorial debut films
2010 comedy films
2010s English-language films
2010s British films